The Chinese Owl is a breed of fancy pigeon developed over many years of selective breeding. Chinese Owls, along with other varieties of domesticated pigeons, are all descendants from the rock pigeon (Columba livia). The breed is known for its small size and profuse frilled feathers. Many specimens of this breed have a 'chin-crest' around the frontal region of its neck - it does not extend around to the back of the head. The feathers are more 'ruffled'and appear 'wind-swept' rather that 'curled' as in the frill varieties. The breed comes in many colors : black, brown (of many hues from near-rust to fawn), blue/ blue-grey, barred, ice, satinette blondinette (these last two possibly cross-breeds), white, pied and white-black (combinations).

See also 

List of pigeon breeds

References

Pigeon breeds
Pigeon breeds originating in Spain
Pigeon breeds originating in Northern Africa